The 2003 Jacksonville State Gamecocks football team represented Jacksonville State University as a member of the Ohio Valley Conference (OVC) during the 2003 NCAA Division I-AA football season. Led by Forth-year head coach Jack Crowe, the Gamecocks compiled an overall record of 8–4 with a mark of 7–1 in conference play, winning the OVC title in their first year in the league and first conference title since transitioning to NCAA Division I-AA competition. Jacksonville State advanced to the NCAA Division I-AA Football Championship playoffs for the first time, losing in the first round to Western Kentucky. The team played home games at Paul Snow Stadium in Jacksonville, Alabama.

Schedule

References

Jacksonville State
Jacksonville State Gamecocks football seasons
Ohio Valley Conference football champion seasons
Jacksonville State Gamecocks football